Joachim Pease (born 1842, date of death unknown) was a United States Navy sailor and a recipient of America's highest military decoration—the Medal of Honor—for his actions in the American Civil War.

Biography
Although Joachim Pease has been referred to as a native of Long Island, New York, recently unearthed records in the National Archives show that when he enlisted in the United States Navy as an Ordinary Seaman on January 12, 1862 for a three-year hitch, he listed his birthplace as Fogo Island which is probably Fogo Island, Cape Verde. He was described as twenty years old, five feet, six and a half inches tall, with black hair and eyes and a "negro" complexion.

Joachim Pease enlisted in the Navy from New Bedford, Massachusetts, not New York City, as commonly reported, and served on board  during the Civil War.

On June 19, 1864, off the coast of Cherbourg, France, Kearsarge battled the Confederate sloop-of-war .  In a report on the third division, he was described:

For his conduct during this Battle of Cherbourg, Pease was awarded the Medal of Honor. He  left the Navy at the end of his enlistment never having received his Medal of Honor. It is on display in the National Museum of the United States Navy,   located in the Washington Navy Yard,   Washington,  D.C.

Medal of Honor citation

Rank and Organization: Seaman, U.S. Navy. 
Born: Long Island, N.Y. 
Accredited To: New York. 
General Order No. 45 (December 31, 1864).

Citation: Served as seaman on board the U.S.S. Kearsarge when she destroyed the Alabama off Cherbourg, France, 19 June 1864. Acting as loader on the No. 2 gun during this bitter engagement, Pease exhibited marked coolness and good conduct and was highly recommended by the divisional officer for gallantry under fire.

Gallery

See also

List of American Civil War Medal of Honor recipients: M–P
List of African American Medal of Honor recipients

Notes

References

Records  of  the  Curator   Branch,  Naval  History   and  Heritage   Command   Museum,   Washington    D.C.

1842 births
United States Navy Medal of Honor recipients
People from Long Island
Union Navy sailors
Year of death unknown
American Civil War recipients of the Medal of Honor